Stay with Me Till Morning is a British television series which was originally broadcast on ITV in 1981. It is based on the 1970 novel of the same title by John Braine.

Cast
 Paul Daneman as  Clive Lendrick
 Nanette Newman as  Robin Lendrick
 Alison Elliott as Petronella Lendrick
 Peggy Aitchison as Joan Walker
 Kate Coleridge as  Vicky Kelvedon
 Peter Laird as  Bruce Kelvedon 
 Keith Barron as Stephen Belgard
 Michael Lees as  Donald Lendrick 
 Simon Fisher-Turner as Harold Thomas
 Lois Baxter as  Ruth Inglewood
 Bill Wallis as  Norman Radstock
 Natalie Ogle as  Olive Villendam
 Richard Beale as  Jesse Thomas
 Frances Cox as  Hilda Thomas
 Malcolm Raeburn as Malcolm Fylde
 Jill Summers as  Waitress
 Paula Tilbrook as Fiona Lendrick

References

Bibliography
Baskin, Ellen. Serials on British Television, 1950-1994. Scolar Press, 1996.

External links
 

ITV television dramas
1981 British television series debuts
1981 British television series endings
English-language television shows
Television shows based on British novels
Television series by Yorkshire Television